The Post Office, or Old Post Office, in Christine, North Dakota, United States, was built in about 1895-98 and was moved in 1906.  It was listed on the National Register of Historic Places in 1977.

It is a -story  building.

References

Government buildings completed in 1895
Post office buildings on the National Register of Historic Places in North Dakota
National Register of Historic Places in Richland County, North Dakota
Relocated buildings and structures in North Dakota
1895 establishments in North Dakota